Acappella Vocal Band (AVB) was a vocal group put together by Keith Lancaster in 1986 to augment the vocal group Acappella. AVB's popularity and ministry quickly grew, prompting Lancaster to launch AVB as a full-time touring group in 1988. AVB went through various lineup and stylistic changes before disbanding in 2000.

In addition to their early duties as Acappella's opening act and augmentation group, AVB performed and recorded as an independent ensemble. Many of their recordings, which included Give Me Light (1987) and Steppin' On A Cloud (1988), were later re-released on a CD titled The Early Years. In June 1988, with Acappella's expansion to a quartet, AVB branched off to tour on their own under the auspices of Acappella Ministries. Both groups underwent a shift in musical style during this period. Whereas previously, they had covered traditional hymns, praise songs and contemporary Christian pop music, both Acappella and AVB now recorded and performed primarily original music, much of which was composed by Lancaster. Acappella forged ahead with an adult contemporary sound while AVB targeted the youth market.

With Song In My Soul (1989), AVB made a major shift toward contemporary pop, rock and R&B sounds, though still entirely produced a cappella. On What's Your Tag Say?, the shift toward slick hip-hop and R&B was even greater, with a strong lyrical focus on the youth market and extensive choreography incorporated into their live performances. By the time Celebrate And Party became popular, the transformation to a near-perfect a cappella mimicry of the new jack swing style had been achieved, with a sound similar to Take 6, Boyz II Men, and Tony! Toni! Toné!. The song U & Me & God Make 5 followed in 1993, producing a hit on the CCM charts. The AVB lineup of John K. Green, Brishan Hatcher, Wes McKinzie, Max Plaster and Steve Reischl also recorded AVB's Spanish project, Caminando en la Luz (1994), and "greatest hits" compilation, The Road (1995).

After a brief hiatus, AVB returned with a different lineup for Way of Life and yet another lineup and sound for Real. Although the group is now defunct, almost 30 former members reunited in Nashville for a concert in July 2009.

Previous members

Todd Austin – Nashville, TN.
Chad Bahr – Graphic designer in Plato, MN.
Shannon Beasley – Teaches English at Arkansas State University. Personal trainer for Victory Fitness.
Luke Brown – Singer/songwriter in Nashville, TN.
Tony Brown – Worship minister at Grace Harbor Church in Rogers, AR.
Dale Cal – Independent environmental manager in Nashville, TN.
Dale Carpenter – Former worship minister at Highland Park Christian Church in Tulsa, OK.
Terry Cheatham – Counselor; Professor of Psychology at Lipscomb University in Nashville, TN. Terry died in August 2018.
Todd Dunaway – Works for Catalog Music Corporation in Nashville, TN. Also sang bass for Watershed Worship.
Danny Elliott – Police officer in Tulsa, OK.
Dave Fletcher – Works for Microsoft in Seattle, WA.
George Gee – Musical artist in Beverly Hills, CA.
John K. Green – Singer/songwriter/producer in Los Angeles, CA. John was diagnosed with cancer in 2016 and died on November 3, 2020.
Josh Harrison – Director of production for Premier Companies in Franklin, TN.
Brishan Hatcher – Worship minister at Highland Church of Christ in Memphis, TN.
Aaron Herman – Worship Pastor at North Ridge Church, Marshfield, WI.
Chris Lindsey – Worship and Creative Arts Minister at Well House Church in Nashville, TN. Also sang with Watershed Worship.
Wes McKinzie – Assistant Professor of Business at Oklahoma Christian University in Oklahoma City, OK.
Andrew McNeal – Worked as operator manager for a company in Washington D.C. Recorded a solo album entitled "The Lord is Blessing Me." Andrew died in November 2011.
Max L. Plaster – Technical consultant at Edward Jones in St. Louis, MO.
Brian Randolph – Former worship minister at First Street Church in Dumas, TX, and Altamesa Church of Christ in Fort Worth, TX. Brian died in January 2020.
Steve Reischl – Technical director at Dardenne Presbyterian Church in Dardenne Prairie, MO.
Kevin Schaffer – Worship Minister at Central Church of Christ in Amarillo, TX.
Jay Smith – Teacher, songwriter and salesman in Atlanta, GA 
Tim Storms – Featured performer at Pierce Arrow Theater in Branson, MO.
Jeremy Swindle – Worship Minister at Landmark Church of Christ in Montgomery, AL.
Bret Testerman – Started Worship Coach, Inc., providing worship consulting for churches and coaching for worship ministers and is also part of Interim Ministry Partners.

Group formations

Discography
The labels are taken from the original releases; many of the albums have been re-released with new distributors.

 Give Me Light (1987, Clifty Records)
 Steppin' On A Cloud (1988, Clifty Records)
 Song In My Soul (1989, Clifty Records)
 A Savior Is Born! (1989, Clifty Records, with Acappella)
 What's Your Tag Say? (1991, Word)
 Celebrate And Party (1992, Word)
 U And Me And God Make 5 (1993, Word)
 Caminando en la Luz (1994, Word)
 The Road (1995, The Acappella Company)
 Way Of Life (1996, The Acappella Company)
 Real (1999, The Acappella Company)
 The Early Years (2002, The Acappella Company)

AVB also appeared on numerous other recording projects for the Acappella Company (Acappella Series, Acappella Praise and Worship, Acappella Scripture Songs, Keith Lancaster solo projects) and made three video projects: Song In My Soul (1989), Video Party (1993), and The Land of Five (1994).

References

External links
 AVB page on The Acappella Company's website
 Acadisc.com - Christian acappella homepage with all AVB lyrics
 

American Christian musical groups
Professional a cappella groups
Musical groups established in 1986